Dough sheeting technology is used by (industrial) bakeries and rolls out dough into a (consistent) dough sheet with a desired even dough thickness.

Process
Dough is compressed between two or more rotating rollers.  When done the right way, a smooth and consistent dough sheet is produced. The dough then passes one or several gauging rollers (mostly on conveyors) that reduce the dough to the required thickness.  After this the dough sheet is shaped into a desired dough product. This technology is mainly used in industrial production machines for (semi) industrial bakeries and the food industry.  Most dough sheeters can handle a wide variety of dough depending on the machine manufacturer. Most commonly dough sheeting technology is used for the production of laminated dough products like croissants and pastries, but it is also suitable for the production of bread, flatbread and pizza.

Function
	Shape the dough from individual dough batch to continuous dough sheet
	Less damaging of the gluten network
	Laminate layers of dough together (no pocket proofers and dividers are necessary as the dough sheet is the base of every product).

Benefits
A big benefit for using sheeting technology is the large dough capacity that can be handled. Dough sheeting manufactures are able to process high quality dough sheets at high capacities.
Another benefit is that sheeting makes it possible to handle a great variety of dough types which traditional dough production systems can't handle, for example strongly hydrated wet and sticky ciabatta dough.

History
The origin of the dough sheeting process is not specifically traced back to at least 1977 in the case of Rademaker BV, who may be considered to be one of the earliest dough sheeting technology specialists.

Croissants and puff pastry were first products to have been produced with dough sheeting technology. Nowadays the bakery industry sees a trend that also includes the production of bread, flatbread and pizza products being produced with sheeting technology.

External links 
 Massey University on Bread dough sheeting
 Biscuit sheeting technology

References

DrieM produces Dough Sheeting Technology https://kaakgroup.com/kaak-group-members/driem/?lang=nl
Baking
Industrial processes